Lukas is a form of the Latin name Lucas.

Popularity 
In 2013 it was the ninth most popular name for boys in Australia.

Meaning and different spellings
 Amharic - Luqas (ሉቃስ)
 Arabic - Luqa (لوقا) / Luqas (لوكاس)
 Armenian - Ղուկաս, Ghukas
 Croatian / Serbian / Slovenian - Luka (Лука)
 Czech - Lukáš
 Dutch - Lucas / Lukas / Luca
 English - Luke / Lucas / Lukas
 Finnish - Luukas
 French - Lukas
 Georgian - ლუკა
 German - Lukas
 Greek - Loukas (Λουκάς) - Ancient Greek (Λουκᾶς)
 Hungarian - Lukács / Lúkas / Lúkasz
 Icelandic - Lúkas
 Indonesian - Lukas
 Irish: Lúc, Lúcás
 Italian - Luca
 Latin - Lucas (from the verb "lucere")
 Latvian - Lukas
 Lithuanian - Lukas
 Norwegian / Swedish / Danish - Lucas / Lukas
 Anglo-Saxon - Lukas
 Polish - Łukasz
 Portuguese - Lucas
 Russian - Лукьян / Лука
 Slovak - Lukáš
 Slavs - Luka
 Ukrainian - Лук'ян
 Spanish - Lucas
 Turkish - Luka / Lukas
 Japanese - ルーカス
 Korean - 루카스

People named Lukas

As a surname
 Aino-Eevi Lukas (1930–2019), Estonian equestrian, lawyer and politician.
 D. Wayne Lukas (born 1935), American horse racing trainer
 György Lukács, Hungarian philosopher
 J. Anthony Lukas, American journalist
 Kim Lukas, English pop singer 
 Paul Lukas (journalist), American sports writer
 Tena Lukas, Croatian tennis player
 Tõnis Lukas, Estonian politician
 Zdeněk Lukáš, Czech composer, teacher, music editor, and conductor

As a given name
 Lukáš Bauer, Czech cross-country skier
 Łukasz Fabiański, Polish football (soccer) goalkeeper
 Lukas Forchhammer, Danish lead singer of band Lukas Graham
 Lukas Foss, American conductor
 Lukas Gage, American actor
 Lukas Haas, American actor
 Lukas Hartmann, Swiss novelist and children's literature writer
 Lukas Heller, Screenwriter
 Lukas Jutkiewicz, English football (soccer) player
 Lukáš Krajíček, Czech ice hockey player
 Lukáš Lacko, Slovak tennis player
 Lukáš Latinák, Slovak actor
 Lukas Lerager, Danish footballer
 Lukas Lundin (1958–2022), Swedish billionaire
 Lukas MacNaughton, football (soccer) player
 Lukáš Melich, Czech hammer thrower
 Luka Modrić, Croatian football (soccer) player
 Lukas Moodysson, Swedish film writer and director
 Lukáš Pešek, Czech 250ccm Grand Prix motorbike rider
 Lukas Podolski, German football (soccer) player
 Lukas Rieger, German pop singer
 Lukáš Rosol, Czech tennis player
 Lukas Rossi, Canadian musician
 Lukas Runggaldier, Italian Nordic combined athlete
 Lukas Schmitz, German football (soccer) player
 Lukas Tudor, Chilean football (soccer) forward
 Lukas Verzbicas, Lithuanian-American athlete
 Lukas Weißhaidinger, Austrian discus thrower and shot putter

See also
 Loukas (disambiguation)
 Lucas (disambiguation)
 Luca (given name)
 Luka (disambiguation)

References

Danish masculine given names
Dutch masculine given names
German masculine given names
Latvian masculine given names
Lithuanian masculine given names
Norwegian masculine given names
Swedish masculine given names
Estonian-language surnames
Surnames from given names
la:Lucas